Revenge of The Budgie is an album released in 1983 by Nick Reynolds and John Stewart, both former members of the Kingston Trio.

This album was later made available as songs 11 through 17, combined with the Trio Years cassette in 1993 on a CD by Folk Era, called Chilly Winds.

Track listing
All compositions by John Stewart, except where indicated.
Side one
 "Buddy Won't You Roll Down the Line" (Traditional; arranged by Nick Reynolds & John Stewart) – 3:46
 "Dreamers on the Rise" – 2:40
 "Cheyenne" – 2:46
Side two
 "Living on Easy" (Traditional; arranged by Nick Reynolds & John Stewart) – 2:36
 "Hiding in the Shadows" (Lindsey Buckingham, John Stewart) – 4:08
 "Angel on the Road Shoulder" – 2:49
 "Same Old Heart" – 4:05

Personnel
 John Stewart – vocals, guitars, bass, keyboards
 Nick Reynolds – vocals, 8 string tenor guitar, congas
 Lindsey Buckingham – slide guitar ("Living On Easy"), various guitars ("Same Old Heart"), all guitars & percussion ("Hiding In The Shadows"), vocals ("Buddy Won't You Roll Down The Line")
 Gary Busey – vocals ("Buddy Won't You Roll Down The Line")

References

External links
Fleetwood Mac.net discography page.

1983 albums
John Stewart (musician) albums
Takoma Records albums
Albums recorded at Shangri-La (recording studio)